The 2009–10 B-Meg Derby Ace Llamados season was the 22nd season of the franchise in the Philippine Basketball Association (PBA). In the Philippine Cup, they were known as the Purefoods TJ Giants.

Key dates
August 2: The 2009 PBA Draft took place in Fort Bonifacio, Taguig.

Draft picks

Roster

Philippine Cup

Eliminations

Standings

Game log

Eliminations

|- bgcolor="#bbffbb" 
| 1
| October 11
| Burger King
| 93–80
| Raymundo (19)
| Reavis (20)
| R. Yap (8)
| Araneta Coliseum
| 1–0
|- bgcolor="#edbebf" 
| 2
| October 18
| Barangay Ginebra
| 87–95
| J. Yap (21)
| Raymundo (14)
| J. Yap (5)
| Araneta Coliseum
| 1–1
|- bgcolor="#bbffbb"
| 3
| October 23
| Barako Bull
| 92–77
| Raymundo, J. Yap (17)
| Raymundo (8)
| Artadi (9)
| Cuneta Astrodome
| 2–1
|- bgcolor="#edbebf" 
| 4
| October 30
| Coca Cola
| 79–93
| J. Yap (15)
| Raymundo, R. Yap (7)
| R. Yap (4)
| Araneta Coliseum
| 2–2

|- bgcolor="#bbffbb" 
| 5
| November 8
| Talk 'N Text
| 108–102
| Maierhofer (20)
| R. Yap (11)
| Raymundo (7)
| Araneta Coliseum
| 3–2
|- bgcolor="#edbebf" 
| 6
| November 11
| San Miguel
| 76–92
| J. Yap (13)
| R. Yap (8)
| Artadi (5)
| Araneta Coliseum
| 3–3
|- bgcolor="#bbffbb"
| 7
| November 15
| Rain or Shine
| 103–69
| Maierhofer (15)
| Pingris (12)
| Artadi, Timberlake (4)
| Araneta Coliseum
| 4–3
|- bgcolor="#edbebf" 
| 8
| November 22
| Alaska
| 87–101
| Raymundo (25)
| Reavis (14)
| Raymundo, Artadi (4)
| Araneta Coliseum
| 4–4
|- bgcolor="#bbffbb" 
| 9
| November 28
| Sta. Lucia
| 68–63
| Raymundo (15)
| Pingris (12)
| R. Yap (4)
| Surigao del Norte
| 5–4

|- bgcolor="#bbffbb" 
| 10
| December 2
| Coca Cola
| 88–79
| J. Yap (21)
| Reavis (10)
| Artadi (5)
| Araneta Coliseum
| 6–4
|- bgcolor="#bbffbb" 
| 11
| December 6
| Barangay Ginebra
| 89–81
| R. Yap (21)
| Reavis (11)
| R. Yap (4)
| Araneta Coliseum
| 7–4
|- bgcolor="#bbffbb"
| 12
| December 9
| Barako Bull
| 70–66
| J. Yap (18)
| Pingris (7)
| J. Yap, Raymundo (5)
| Araneta Coliseum
| 8–4
|- bgcolor="#edbebf" 
| 13
| December 13
| San Miguel
| 80–87
| Raymundo (14)
| Reavis (13)
| Raymundo, J. Yap (3)
| Araneta Coliseum
| 8–5
|- bgcolor="#edbebf" 
| 14
| December 19
| Talk 'N Text
| 98–101
| J. Yap (28)
| Reavis (10)
| Raymundo (4)
| Araneta Coliseum
| 8–6
|- bgcolor="#bbffbb"
| 15
| December 25
| Burger King
| 85–74
| Raymundo (19)
| Reavis (8)
| R. Yap (5)
| Cuneta Astrodome
| 9–6

|- bgcolor="#bbffbb"
| 16
| January 10
| Rain or Shine
| 101–88
| J. Yap (23)
| Pingris (9)
| Artadi (5)
| Araneta Coliseum
| 10–6
|- bgcolor="#bbffbb"
| 17
| January 15
| Alaska
| 94–77
| Maierhofer, J. Yap (15)
| Reavis (14)
| R. Yap (5)
| Araneta Coliseum
| 11–6
|- bgcolor="#bbffbb"
| 18
| January 17
| Sta. Lucia
| 88–78
| J. Yap (19)
| Pingris (15)
| Raymundo (7)
| Araneta Coliseum
| 12–6

Playoffs

|-  bgcolor="#bbffbb" 
| 1
|  January 29
|  Rain or Shine
|  90–85
|  J. Yap (31)
|  Raymundo (11)
|  Artadi (5)
|  Araneta Coliseum
|  1–0
|-  bgcolor="#bbffbb" 
| 2
|  January 31
|  Rain or Shine
|  95–94
|  J. Yap (23)
|  Reavis (9)
|  J. Yap, R. Yap (3)
|  Araneta Coliseum
|  2–0
|-  bgcolor="#edbebf" 
| 3
|  February 3
|  Rain or Shine
|  92–95
|  Canaleta (18)
|  Reavis (15)
|  Canaleta (6)
|  Araneta Coliseum
|  2–1
|-  bgcolor="#edbebf" 
| 4
|  February 5
|  Rain or Shine
|  100–103
|  Raymundo (34)
|  Reavis (11)
|  R. Yap (7)
|  Araneta Coliseum
|  2–2
|-  bgcolor="#bbffbb" 
| 5
|  February 7
|  Rain or Shine
|  95–85
|  
|  
|  
|  Araneta Coliseum
|  3–2

|-  bgcolor="#edbebf" 
| 1
| February 10
| San Miguel
| 83–99
| Raymundo (18)
| Pingris (10)
| Pingris (3)
| Araneta Coliseum
| 0–1
|-  bgcolor="#bbffbb" 
| 2
| February 12
| San Miguel
| 103–84
| Reavis (20)
| Reavis, Pingris (12)
| R. Yap (4)
| Cuneta Astrodome
| 1–1
|-  bgcolor="#edbebf" 
| 3
| February 14
| San Miguel
| 76–88
| Canaleta, J. Yap (14)
| Reavis (7)
| R. Yap (3)
| Araneta Coliseum
| 1–2
|-  bgcolor="#bbffbb" 
| 4
| February 17
| San Miguel
| 97–84
| J. Yap (24)
| Reavis (14)
| R. Yap (10)
| Araneta Coliseum
| 2–2
|-  bgcolor="#bbffbb" 
| 5
| February 19
| San Miguel
| 94–82
| Raymundo, R. Yap (18)
| Raymundo, Maierhofer (8)
| R. Yap (6)
| Araneta Coliseum
| 3–2
|-  bgcolor="#bbffbb" 
| 6
| February 21
| San Miguel
| 87–78
| R. Yap (20)
| Pingris (13)
| R. Yap (4)
| Cuneta Astrodome
| 4–2

|-bgcolor="#bbffbb"
| 1
| February 24
| Alaska
| 81–77
| J. Yap (24)
| Pingris (13)
| R. Yap (5)
| Araneta Coliseum
| 1–0
|-bgcolor="#bbffbb"
| 2
| February 26
| Alaska
| 86–85
| J. Yap (32)
| Raymundo, Reavis (7)
| R. Yap (4)
| Araneta Coliseum
| 2–0
|-bgcolor="#bbffbb"
| 3
| February 28
| Alaska
| 79–78
| J. Yap (14)
| Pingris (11)
| Simon, J. Yap (3)
| Araneta Coliseum
| 3–0
|-bgcolor="#bbffbb"
| 4
| March 3
| Alaska
| 86–76
| J. Yap (18)
| R. Yap (9)
| R. Yap (6)
| Araneta Coliseum
| 4–0

Fiesta Conference

Eliminations

Standings

Game log

Transactions

Pre-season

Imports recruited

References

Magnolia Hotshots seasons
B-meg